J Prince Presents R.N.D.S. (Realest Niggaz Down South) is a two-disc compilation album of presented and executive produced by Rap-A-Lot Records CEO J. Prince. It was released on October 5, 1999 through Priority Records.

Production was handled by Mr. Lee, Mike Dean, Domo, Double D, Platinum, Hurt-M-Badd, Jermaine Dupri, John Bido, Mannie Fresh, Pimp C, Precise, Scarface, Swift, Tela and Tone Capone. It is composed of 27 songs performed by many artists from Rap-A-Lot roster of the time, such as Scarface, Tela, Big Mike, Dorasel, Willie D, 5th Ward Boyz, Ghetto Twiinz and Devin the Dude, as well as fellow popular American Southern underground gangsta rap acts, including S.U.C.'s Al-D, Clay-Doe, DJ Screw, E.S.G., Fat Pat and Mike D, Big Tymers, Mystikal and Master P, an early appearance by a then-unknown Ludacris and an appearance from boxer Roy Jones Jr.

The album peaked at No. 58 on the Billboard 200 and No. 7 on the Top R&B/Hip-Hop Albums chart.

The edited version omits 16 songs, drastically reducing the album to only one disc and leaving only 11 songs. A chopped and screwed version of the album was released in 2004 and is currently the only version of this album still in print.

In his review to AllMusic, Steve Huey wrote: "Over the course of two discs, J-Prince Presents: Realest Niggaz Down South tends to lose its momentum with too many mediocre contributions, but the sampler does have its fair share of good moments, which will make it worthwhile at least for some gangsta and Southern rap fans. Highlights come from Scarface, Goodie Mob, UGK, Willie D, Big Mike, MC Breed, 3-6 Mafia, the Hot Boyz, and Devin, among others".

Track listing

Charts

References

External links

1999 compilation albums
Hip hop compilation albums
Albums produced by Hurt-M-Badd
Gangsta rap compilation albums
Albums produced by Mannie Fresh
Albums produced by Jermaine Dupri
Priority Records compilation albums
Southern hip hop compilation albums
Rap-A-Lot Records compilation albums
Albums produced by Mike Dean (record producer)